Sona Charaipotra is an American entertainment and lifestyle journalist, and author of young adult fiction. She is best known for her YA lit column on Parade.com and her YA series Tiny Pretty Things.

Early life 
Charaipotra is Indian-American, born to two pediatrician parents. Despite family hopes of becoming a doctor, she chose to become a writer. She has two siblings.

Charaipotra attended Rutgers University with a double major in journalism and American studies. She earned a master's degree in dramatic writing and South Asian diaspora studies from NYU in 2006. In 2012, Charaipotra graduated with an MFA from The New School, where she studied creative writing in the Writing for Children program.

Sona Charaipotra has two kids.

Career 
Aside from writing novels, she is a freelance journalist and editor for entertainment sites like The New York Times, Cosmopolitan, Bustle.com, Parade.com, Teen Vogue, Vulture.com, and other US media. Charaipotra made a name as a celebrity journalist for People and an editor at the now defunct TeenPeople. She has also been an editor for parenting publications like WhatToExpect.com and TheBump.com, and was the editor of the Barnes & Noble Teen Blog.

In 2013, Charaipotra co-founded CAKE Literary, a "boutique book development company with a decidedly diverse bent", with her Tiny Pretty Things co-author Dhonielle Clayton. The two friends met at The New School at the beginning of their MFA and bonded over a shared feeling that they were unrepresented in children and YA books growing up and wanting to change that. They founded CAKE Literary on the belief that "rich, diversity-infused reads that are still compulsively readable — and very relatable" are possible. The company focuses on developing readable, high concept ideas to middle grade, YA, and women's fiction. In 2021, Clayton relaunched the company as Cake Creative.

Charaipotra is a team member of We Need Diverse Books, a non-profit organization focused on increasing diversity in book publishing. She is also a screenwriter, whose projects have been developed by MTV films.

Selected works 
Her solo debut, Symptoms of a Heartbreak, was inspired by shows like Doogie Howser, M.D. Charaipotra saw the novel as an opportunity to write a similar story with Indian protagonists. The first season of a Netflix Original TV show based on Charaipotra's series Tiny Pretty Things, is set for release in October 2020.

Bibliography

Novels 

 Tiny Pretty Things Series, co-authored with Dhonielle Clayton.

 Tiny Pretty Things (HarperTeen, 2015)
 Shiny Broken Pieces (HarperTeen, 2016)

 Symptoms of a Heartbreak (Macmillan Publishers, Imprint, 2019)
 How Maya Got Fierce (Macmillan Publishers, Imprint, 2021)

Short stories 

 Good Girls Marry Doctors: South Asian American Daughters on Obedience and Rebellion (Aunt Lute Books, 2016)
 "Still Star-Crossed" in A Thousand Beginnings and Endings, edited by Ellen Oh and Elsie Chapman (Greenwillow Books, 2018)
 "Chilled Monkey Brains" in Our Stories, Our Voices: 21 YA Authors Get Real About Injustice, Empowerment, and Growing Up Female in America, edited by Amy Reed (Simon Pulse, 2018)
 "The Trip" in Come on In: 15 Stories about Immigration and Finding Home, edited by Adi Alsaid (Inkyard/Harper, 2020)

References 

Living people
21st-century American novelists
Year of birth missing (living people)
The New School alumni
21st-century Indian short story writers
21st-century Indian women writers
21st-century Indian writers
New York University alumni
Rutgers University alumni